This is a list of monuments in Jajarkot District, Nepal, as officially recognized by and listed on the website of the Department of Archaeology, Nepal.

List of monuments

|}

See also 
 List of monuments in Karnali Province
 List of monuments in Nepal

References 

Jajarkot